The Shaughraun is a 1912 American silent film produced by Kalem Company and distributed by General Films Company. It was directed by Sidney Olcott with himself, Gene Gauntier, Alice Hollister and Jack J. Clark in the leading roles.

Cast

Production notes
 The film was shot in Beaufort, County Kerry, Ireland, during the summer of 1912.

References
 Michel Derrien, Aux origines du cinéma irlandais: Sidney Olcott, le premier oeil, TIR 2013.  
 The Moving Picture World, Vol 14, p 954, p 972 and p 1075. 
 The New York Dramatic Mirror, January 1, 1913. 
 Motion Picture Story Magazine, January 1913, pp 41–51. 
 Kevin Rockett, Irish Filmography, p 259.

External links

 The Shaughraun website dedicated to Sidney Olcott

1912 films
Silent American drama films
American silent short films
Films set in Ireland
Films shot in Ireland
Films directed by Sidney Olcott
1912 short films
1912 drama films
American black-and-white films
1910s American films